Events in the year 1881 in Norway.

Incumbents
Monarch: Oscar II

Events

Arts and literature

Norwegian playwright, Henrik Ibsen's, Ghosts, is released.

Births

January to June
5 January – Jørgen Bru, sport shooter (died 1974)
24 February – Per Askim, naval officer (died 1963).
27 February – Sigvard Sivertsen, gymnast and Olympic gold medallist (died 1963)
11 March – Wictor Esbensen, mariner and explorer (died 1942)
17 March – Kristian Elster, Jr, novelist, literary historian, theatre critic and biographer (born 1881).
20 March – Dorthea Dahl, writer in America (died 1958)
26 March – Marta Marie Nielsen, schoolteacher and politician (d. 1948).
6 June – Anton Djupvik, politician (died 1951)

July to September
23 July – Thorleiv Røhn, military officer, gymnast and Olympic gold medallist (died 1963)
15 September – Wilhelm Blystad, track and field athlete (died 1954)
11 October – Leif Georg Ferdinand Bang, politician
25 October – Oskar Braaten, novelist and playwright (died 1939)
27 October – Edvard Larsen, triple jumper and Olympic bronze medallist (died 1914)
29 October – Niels Christian Ditleff, diplomat (died 1956)
15 November – Andreas Hagelund, gymnast and Olympic gold medallist (died 1967)
4 December – Edvard Bull, Sr., historian and politician (died 1932)
17 December – Yngvar Bryn, track and field athlete and pairs figure skater (died 1947)
27 December – Sigvart Johansen, rifle shooter and Olympic bronze medallist

Full date unknown
Erik Glosimodt, architect (died 1921)
Marie Hamsun, actor and writer (died 1969)
Sigurd Halvorsen Johannessen, politician (died 1964)
Per Larssen, politician and Minister (died 1947)
Knut Liestøl, politician and Minister (died 1952)
Kristian Prestrud, polar explorer (died 1927)
Jakob Sverdrup, philologist and lexicographer (died 1938)

Deaths
7 January – Jens Zetlitz Kielland, consul and artist (born 1816)
11 April – Kristian Elster, Sr, novelist, journalist, literary critic and theatre critic (born 1841).

Full date unknown
Jens Henrik Beer, businessperson, farmer and politician (born 1799)
Jens Gran, politician (born 1794)
Christopher Andreas Holmboe, philologist (born 1796)
Peter Daniel B. W. Kildal, politician (born 1816)
Thomas Konow, naval officer and politician (born 1796)
Ludvig Vibe, philologist and educator (born 1803)

See also

References